Immunoglobulin heavy locus, also known as IGH, is a region on human chromosome 14 that contains a gene for the heavy chains of human antibodies (or immunoglobulins).

Immunoglobulins recognize foreign antigens and initiate immune responses such as phagocytosis and the complement system. Each immunoglobulin molecule consists of two identical heavy chains and two identical light chains. This region represents the germline organization of the heavy chain locus. The locus includes V (variable), D (diversity), J (joining), and C (constant) segments. During B cell development, a recombination event at the DNA level joins a single D segment with a J segment; the fused D-J exon of this partially rearranged D-J region is then joined to a V segment. The rearranged V-D-J region containing a fused V-D-J exon is then transcribed and fused at the RNA level to the IGHM constant region; this transcript encodes a mu heavy chain. Later in development B cells generate V-D-J-Cmu-Cdelta pre-messenger RNA, which is alternatively spliced to encode either a mu or a delta heavy chain. Mature B cells in the lymph nodes undergo switch recombination, so that the fused V-D-J gene segment is brought in proximity to one of the IGHG, IGHA, or IGHE gene segments and each cell expresses either the gamma, alpha, or epsilon heavy chain. Potential recombination of many different V segments with several J segments provides a wide range of antigen recognition. Additional diversity is attained by junctional diversity, resulting from the random addition of nucleotides by terminal deoxynucleotidyl transferase, and by somatic hypermutation, which occurs during B cell maturation in the spleen and lymph nodes. Several V, D, J, and C segments are known to be incapable of encoding a protein and are considered pseudogenous gene segments (often simply referred to as pseudogenes).

Nomenclature
Symbols for variable (V) immunoglobulin gene segments start with IGHV and include two or three numbers separated by dashes. Examples:

IGHV1-2, IGHV1-3, …, IGHV1-69-2, IGHV2-5, …, IGHV7-4-1

Symbols for diversity (D) immunoglobulin gene segments start with IGHD and include two numbers separated by dashes. Examples:

IGHD1-1, IGHD1-7, …, IGHD7-27

Symbols for joining (J) immunoglobulin gene segments:

IGHJ1, IGHJ2, IGHJ3, IGHJ4, IGHJ5, IGHJ6

Symbols for constant region (C) immunoglobulin genes:

Heavy chain alpha (IgA): IGHA1, IGHA2

Heavy chain gamma (IgG): IGHG1, IGHG2, IGHG3, IGHG4

Heavy chain delta (IgD): IGHD

Heavy chain epsilon (IgE): IGHE

Heavy chain mu (IgM): IGHM

See also
 IGHV@

References

Further reading

Antibodies